The women's discus throw at the 2019 World Athletics Championships was held at the Khalifa International Stadium in Doha, Qatar, from 2 to 4 October 2019.

Summary
In the finals, Feng Bin threw 62.48m as the first thrower in the ring.  The next thrower was world leader Yaime Pérez, who promptly took the lead with a 68.10m.  Three throwers later, defending champion and double Olympic champion Sandra Perković threw 66.72m to take over second place.  Those three held their positions until the end of the second round, when 2015 champion Denia Caballero dropped in a 66.80m to move into silver position.  In fact, the three over 66 and a half metres would be the only ones over 63.50m all day.  Caballero improved her position with a 67.32m in the third then took the lead with a 68.44m in the fourth round.  Her teammate Pérez answered in the fifth round with the winner .

Records
Before the competition records were as follows:

Schedule
The event schedule, in local time (UTC+3), is as follows:

Results

Qualification
Qualification: Qualifying Performance 63.00 (Q) or at least 12 best performers (q) advanced to the final.

Final
The final was started on 4 October at 21:00.

References

Women's discus throw
Discus throw at the World Athletics Championships